Día Tras Día is the fifth studio album by the Colombian musician Andrés Cepeda the album is written in collaboration with the Cuban musician Amaury Gutiérrez.

Track listing

Awards
The album was nominated for the following 2009 Latin Grammy Awards:

Album of the Year: Día Tras Día
Song of the Year: "Día Tras Día" - Yoel Henríquez and Jorge Luis Piloto, songwriters
Best Male Pop Vocal Album: Día Tras Día

2009 albums
Andrés Cepeda albums
Spanish-language albums